Iraki (Dargwa: Иракьи) is a rural locality (a selo) in Dibgashinsky Selsoviet, Dakhadayevsky District, Republic of Dagestan, Russia. The population was 391 as of 2010. There are 2 streets.

Geography
Iraki is located 11 km east of Urkarakh (the district's administrative centre) by road. Dibgashi and Kalkni are the nearest rural localities.

Nationalities 
Dargins live there.

References 

Rural localities in Dakhadayevsky District